The 1981 Daihatsu Challenge was a women's singles tennis tournament played on indoor carpet courts at the Brighton Centre in Brighton in England. The event was part of the Category 4 tier of the 1981 Toyota Series. It was the fourth edition of the tournament and was held from 19 October through 25 October 1981. Seventh-seeded Sue Barker won the singles title and earned $22,000 first-prize money.

Finals

Singles
 Sue Barker defeated  Mima Jaušovec 4–6, 6–1, 6–1
It was Barker's 1st singles title of the year and the 12th, and last, of her career.

Doubles
 Barbara Potter /  Anne Smith defeated  Mima Jaušovec /  Pam Shriver 6–7, 6–3, 6–4

Prize money

Notes

References

External links
 International Tennis Federation (ITF) tournament event details
 Tournament draws

Daihatsu Challenge
Daihatsu Challenge
Brighton International
Daihatsu Challenge
Daihatsu Challenge